Veikko Johannes Turunen (19 June 1930, in Harlu – 18 July 2006) was a Finnish Lutheran clergyman and politician. He was a member of the Parliament of Finland from 1972 to 1975, representing the Finnish Christian League.

References

1930 births
2006 deaths
People from Pitkyarantsky District
20th-century Finnish Lutheran clergy
Christian Democrats (Finland) politicians
Members of the Parliament of Finland (1972–75)
University of Helsinki alumni